Isaac Clemens (January 21, 1815 – September 24, 1880) was an Ontario farmer and political figure. He represented Waterloo South in the Legislative Assembly of Ontario as a Liberal member from 1867 to 1874.

He was born near Speedsville in Waterloo County in 1815, a descendant of Pennsylvania Dutch settlers. He served as reeve of Waterloo Township for 10 years and as county warden.

External links 
Member's parliamentary history for the Legislative Assembly of Ontario 
A Biographical History of Waterloo Rownship..., Ezra E Eby (1895)

1815 births
1880 deaths
Ontario Liberal Party MPPs
Canadian people of American descent
Canadian people of Dutch descent